Book I is an album by Pastor Troy and The Congregation, released in 2000.

Critical reception
AllMusic wrote that "these cuts are full of a tightly compressed, even claustrophobic energy that bespeaks too many years spent on the low-rent side of boom-economy America."

Track listing

Personnel
Pastor Troy & The Congregation
Pastor Troy
S.M.K.
11/29

Additional information
Additional vocals by Darnell Phillips on track 6.
Additional bass guitar, guitars and keyboards on all tracks by Kevin Haywood.
Mastered by Rodney Mills at Master House Studios, Atlanta, GA.
Recorded at Patchwerks Studios, Atlanta, GA, and Purple Dragon Studios, Atlanta, GA.

References

Collaborative albums
Pastor Troy albums
2000 albums